The Board of Guardians (Default) Act 1926 was a British Act of Parliament passed on 15 July 1926 which allowed the Minister of Health to reconstitute a Board of Guardians if he considered that the Board of Guardians was not properly performing its functions. The Act allowed for Boards of Guardians to be replaced by government officials.

References

Poor Law in Britain and Ireland
United Kingdom Acts of Parliament 1926